Margaret Gertrude Mary (Monique) Smit (born 9 April 1989) is a Dutch singer and television presenter.

Early life 
Monique grew up in Volendam as the younger sister of Jan Smit. After finishing school, she attended Don Bosco College, and later became a hairdresser.

Career
Smit participated in her brother's reality series Gewoon Jan Smit. She presented the show Zapp Kids Top 20 for TROS and  Wild van Muziek broadcast on Sterren 24.

She also appeared in the reality show Just the Two of Us in 2007 where she came in second and performed in a duet with Xander de Buisonjé. Smit debuted with her solo "Wild", which was in top five in 2007. One year later she released her first solo album Stel Je Voor, which contains singles like ""Vrouwenalfabet" and "Stel Je Voor".

Smit has released four music albums and several music singles. In 2023 she made headlines by inspiring a hate-campaign against Dutch poet Pim Lammers.

Albums
Stel je voor [limited edition] (2008)
Verder [14 tracks] (2010)
Grenzeloos (in partnership with Tim Douwsma) (2013)
2 kleine kleutertjes (2015)
Sinterklaas is in het land (2016)
Kerstliedjes (2017)

References

External links

1989 births
Living people
21st-century Dutch singers